DeLuxe Bar and Grill is a restaurant in Seattle's Capitol Hill neighborhood, in the United States.

Description 
Seattle Metropolitan has described DeLuxe as "Broadway's veteran, with a 40-plus year history of serving burgers to the people". The menu has included burgers and sandwiches, fish and chips, a Cobb salad with chicken, a Vietnam Chop Chop salad, and baked potatoes. The Bour B-Q burger has a prime beef patty with smoked cheddar and bourbon barbecue sauce, and is served with onion rings and coleslaw. The happy hour menu has included quesadillas (including Southwest crab and vegetable varieties) served with salsa and sour cream, sliders, black bean nachos, spinach and artichoke dip, and microbrews.

History 
The business has operated at the same location for decades.

Reception 
In 2011, Tan Vinh of The Seattle Times recommended the burger on the happy hour menu. Mark Van Streefkerk included DeLuxe in Eater Seattle's 2022 list of "11 Great Seattle Spots for Elaborate Nonalcoholic Drinks".

References

External links 

 
 DeLuxe Bar & Grill at Zomato

Capitol Hill, Seattle
Restaurants in Seattle